The Hamburg temple model is a Baroque architectural model of the Temple of Solomon. It is square, with four wings and nine courtyards, two of them in the central axis.

It was made from 1680 to 1692 after being commissioned by the Hamburg senator and founder and director of the Hamburg Opera, Gerhard Schott. The model was first exhibited at the Hamburg Opera. After his death, Schott's heirs put the model up for sale in London, where it was acquired by an agent of Frederick Augustus I, King of Poland. In 1732 it was taken to Dresden, where it was shown as part of the collection of Jewish ceremonial art. After the restructuring of this collection in the early 19th Century the model had several owners, before being acquired by the Hamburg Museum in 1910.

Schott's model is in the tradition of many Renaissance and Baroque attempts at reconstruction of the temple by theological and architectural scholars. The Hamburg-based model closely follows an interpretation by the Spanish Jesuit Juan Bautista Villalpando in 1604, in turn, based on the Third Temple described in the Book of Ezekiel.

The reason the expensive and complex model was commissioned is unknown.

Gallery

References

External links

Solomon's Temple
Architectural history
Jewish art
Jews and Judaism in Hamburg
Objects in the Museum for Hamburg History